Paul Shanahan is an Irish hurler who plays as a forward for the Tipperary senior team. He plays his club hurling with  Upperchurch–Drombane.

Career
Shanahan made his senior debut for the Tipperary hurling team on 3 February 2018 in the second round of the 2018 National Hurling League against Waterford when he came on as a substitute in the first half.

References

Living people
Upperchurch-Drombane hurlers
Tipperary inter-county hurlers
Year of birth missing (living people)